Chandramoulisvarar Temple, Arichandrapuram, also known as Arichandhiram  is a Siva temple in near Pattisvaram near Kumbakonam in Thanjavur District in Tamil Nadu (India).

Vaippu Sthalam
It is one of the shrines of the Vaippu Sthalams sung by Tamil Saivite Nayanar Appar.

Presiding deity

The presiding deity is known as Chandramoulisvarar. His consort is known as Soundaravalli.  In the kosta of the presiding deity Dakshinamurthy is found. Surya, Chandra and Bairava are also found in this temple. Shrines of Vinayaka, Subramania with his consorts Valli and Deivanai, and Mahalakshmi are found.

Kumbhabhishekham
The Kumbhabhishekham of this temple was held in 26 June 1980 and in 24 November 2017

References

External links
 Muvar Thevara Vaippu Thalangal, மூவர் தேவார வைப்புத்தலங்கள், Arichandhiram, Sl.No.12 of 139 temples
 Shiva Temples, தேவார வைப்புத்தலங்கள், அரிச்சந்திரம், Sl.No.9 of 133 temples, page1

Hindu temples in Thanjavur district